Brush Creek is a  long 2nd order tributary to Reedy Fork in Guilford County, North Carolina.

Course
Brush Creek rises on the Deep River divide about 0.5 miles northwest of Piedmont Triad International Airport in Guilford County, North Carolina.  Brush Creek then flows northeast to meet Reedy Fork in Lake Brandt.

Watershed
Brush Creek drains  of area, receives about 44.8 in/year of precipitation, has a topographic wetness index of 419.83 and is about 26% forested.

References

External links
 USGS Water Gauge on Brush Creek at Muirfield Road

Rivers of North Carolina
Rivers of Guilford County, North Carolina